Pacha is a rural locality (a village) and the administrative center of Zheleznodorozhnoye Rural Settlement, Sheksninsky District, Vologda Oblast, Russia. The population was 446 as of 2002. There are 3 streets.

Geography 
Pacha is located 16 km west of Sheksna (the district's administrative centre) by road. Shayma is the nearest rural locality.

References 

Rural localities in Sheksninsky District